The  are a Japanese women's softball team based in Konan, Shiga. The Brave Bearies compete in the Japan Diamond Softball League (JD.League) as a member of the league's West Division.

History
The Brave Bearies were founded in 1972, as NSK softball team.

The Japan Diamond Softball League (JD.League) was founded in 2022, and the Brave Bearies became part of the new league as a member of the West Division.

Roster

References

External links
 
 NSK Brave Bearies - JD.League
 
 

Japan Diamond Softball League
Women's softball teams in Japan
Sports teams in Shiga Prefecture